Peter P. Canavan (born 1949) was an Irish policeman with the Garda Síochána (17441F) and a recipient of the Scott Medal.

Canavan was a native of Kilkerrin, County Galway, and prior to joining the force was a farmer. He joined the Garda Síochána on 12 March 1969.

Rathmines post office raid

Canavan was one of five Gardaí awarded the Scott Medal in responding to an armed raid at Rathmines post office, Dublin, on 10 August 1979. Shots were exchanged during a high-speed chase on busy streets, while Canavan reported the incident to Garda Communications Centre at Dublin Castle. The raiders were eventually cornered and after further exchanges of shots, surrendered. The sum of £20,000 stolen in the robbery was recovered. 

Gardaí Michael P. Grenville, James Fagan, Peter P. Canavan, Michael Kennedy, and John K. Mullins, were all presented with the Scott Medal at Templemore in 1980.

See also
 Yvonne Burke (Garda)
 Brian Connaughton
 Michael J. Reynolds
 Joseph Scott
 Deaths of Henry Byrne and John Morley (1980)
 Death of Jerry McCabe (1996)

References
 An Garda Síochána and the Scott Medal, p. 105, Gerard O'Brien, Four Courts Press, 2008. 

People from County Galway
Garda Síochána officers
Living people
1949 births